The Double Canon ("Raoul Dufy in Memoriam") is a short composition for string quartet by Igor Stravinsky, composed in 1959. It lasts only about a minute and a quarter in performance.

History
Although it is a memorial piece for the painter Raoul Dufy, who had died on 23 March 1953, the Double Canon is not a personal tribute, for the two men had never met. The work originated as a duet for flute and clarinet, composed in Venice in September 1959 as a souvenir piece in response to a request for an autograph. Later expanded for string quartet, it had its first performance at a Stravinsky festival in New York, either on 20 December 1959, or else on 10 January 1960 in a concert also featuring the premiere of the Movements for piano and orchestra.

Analysis
The Double Canon is exceptional in Stravinsky's twelve-tone compositions in that it uses transposed forms of the row. Stravinsky's habitual practice was to use only untransposed row forms.

The first five notes of Stravinsky's series for the Double Canon are equivalent to the five-note set of In Memoriam Dylan Thomas, and also are closely related to sets used in Agon, Epitaphium, and A Sermon, a Narrative and a Prayer. It is representative of the earliest phase of Stravinsky's serial practice, when he had not yet developed the technique of hexachordal rotation that characterizes his music written from the Movements onward.

References

Sources

Further reading
 Straus, Joseph N. (2004). Stravinsky's Late Music. Cambridge Studies in Music Theory and Analysis 16. Cambridge University Press. pp. 11–18. .
 Walsh, Stephen. 1988. The Music of Stravinsky. London and New York: Routledge. See esp. pp. 235–238.

Compositions by Igor Stravinsky
1959 compositions
Compositions for string quartet
Funerary and memorial compositions
Twelve-tone compositions